Farhan Saeed Butt is a Pakistani singer-songwriter, actor, music video director, and entrepreneur. Saeed is the former lead vocalist of the Pakistani band Jal and owns the restaurant Cafe Rock in Lahore. He sings in Urdu and Punjabi.

Personal life
Farhan Saeed Butt was born into a Punjabi Kashmiri family. Both his parents are practicing doctors. A music fan from the very start, he used to listen to Vital Signs and Junoon and centred his music around pop, and at times folk. In his teens, he took A-level from Keynesian Institute of Management and Sciences (KIMS) and then enrolled for Computer sciences at National University of Computer and Emerging Sciences, after which he discovered his future band members in Atif Aslam and Goher Mumtaz. The band took off and became famous across Asia. In 2011, reports broke out that he had parted his ways from Jal, which left his fans stunned. He pursued a solo career and became regular to feature in Bollywood. Saeed opened Cafe Rock restaurant at Hussain Chowk, situated off the M. M. Alam Road, Gulberg, Lahore. His restaurant's theme is in a similar vein to that of the Hard Rock Cafes, providing underground bands and young aspiring artists with a platform to project themselves and perform in front of an audience. He married actress Urwa Hocane on 16 December 2016.

Career

Jal the band
Saeed first rose to prominence when he joined the Lahore-based pop rock band Jal, at the age of 17, as a vocalist.

Saeed replaced Atif Aslam in 2003, who quit because of musical differences with Jal's founding member Goher Mumtaz.

Solo music career
In September 2011, in an exclusive interview with The Express Tribune, Saeed shocked the fans claiming that he has left Jal to pursue a solo career despite Goher Mumtaz offering him to continue his solo career while being a part of Jal. On 8 September 2011, Saeed's departure was confirmed by Jal's guitarist Goher Mumtaz who wished him luck for his solo career. He did a collab with Aima Baig, Adnan Qazi and Bilal Saeed for his super hit song "Na cher malangaan nu". His recent song was with Hania Aamir for Asim Jofa that was directed by Qasim Ali Mureed.

He made his Bollywood-singing breakthrough in 2014, by contributing a song to Vikram Bhatt's Creature 3D. The song, Naam-e-Wafa, is a romantic-duet with Indian vocalist Tulsi Kumar as the co-singer and Mithoon as the composer.

Acting career
Saeed started his acting career by debuting in a leading role in the 2014 Hum TV drama serial De Ijazat Jo Tu alongside Sohai Ali Abro, Saba Hameed and Javaid Sheikh. He then played the lead role as Mohid Shuja in ARY Digital's Mere Ajnabi serv go alongside Urwa Hocane who was the female lead. He has also played a lead role of Arsh in the drama Udaari as a lawyer along with female lead Urwa. Apart from acting in the drama, Saeed has also collaborated with Hadiqa Kiani for the OST that has topped music charts all over Pakistan.

Always in 2016 he also played the lead role again in ARY Digital's Teri Chah Mein, alongside Maria Wasti and Saboor Ali, and Hum TV's Sila alongside Ainy Jaffri.

In 2018 he grabbed the leading role of Arsal Jamshed Ali (Arsal) in Hum TV's critically and commercially superhit drama serial Suno Chanda, with Iqra Aziz as the leading female role, and due to the critical success of the show, a season 2 was immediately announced by the producers. He reprised his role as Arsal Jamshed Ali in the second installment of Suno Chanda alongside Iqra Aziz in 2019. The season was also a hit and a critical success. Saeed is recently shooting for two upcoming projects with Hania Amir: One is webseries produced and directed by Wajahat Rauf and the other is a drama, again with Amir, and directed by Qasim Ali Mureed.. Right now, He is working as male lead as "Hamza" in "Mere Humsafar" opposite female lead Hania Amir.

He had the leading role in Karachi Se Lahore 3 with Kubra Khan as co-star, the third installment of Wajahat Rauf's successful series including the box-office hits Karachi Se Lahore and Lahore Se Aagey, and which would have been his feature film debut, but he had to quit the project because of music tours and concerts he was already committed to.

In early 2019 it was announced that he'll get his first lead role in a movie in Tich Button, a rom-com co-produced by his wife Urwa Hocane under their joint new production company Shooting Star Studio.

As a director
He turned to direction with the 2018 music video of O Jaana from the singer-songwriter Hamza Malik, starring actress Iqra Aziz and featuring musicians Rahat Fateh Ali Khan and Sahir Ali Bagga.

Discography

Album

Songs

As director

Filmography

Television

Film

Awards and nominations

References

External links 
 
 
 
 
 

Living people
Pakistani male singers
Singers from Lahore
Punjabi-language singers
Pakistani male television actors
Pakistani restaurateurs
Pakistani music video directors
Kashmiri people
Pakistani people of Kashmiri descent
Pakistani male actors
National University of Computer and Emerging Sciences alumni
1984 births